Corntown is a small hamlet, located 0.5 miles northeast of Conon Bridge in Ross-shire, Scottish Highlands and is in the Scottish council area of Highland.

References

Populated places in Ross and Cromarty